McDonell Central Catholic High School is a Roman Catholic high school in Chippewa Falls, Wisconsin in the Diocese of La Crosse. It is the only Catholic high school in Chippewa County.

History

The first McDonell Catholic High School was built in 1907, on a site overlooking downtown Chippewa Falls. It is listed on the State and National Register of Historic Places.

Later this building was vacant for a period after the diocese relocated the high school to a larger, more suburban facility. It was purchased by the Chippewa Valley Cultural Association and converted in 2000 into the Heyde Center for the Arts.

McDonell Central Catholic High School is located at 1316 Bel Air Boulevard.

Sports
The McDonell Central football coach Gerry Uchytil was elected into the state's football coaches hall of fame.

In 1997, the football team won the CWCC conference title.  It was the team's last conference title before the folding of WISSA.

In 2009 the Macks lost to Burlington Catholic High School in the state championship.

In 2016, the Macks won the WIAA men's division five basketball championship game.

Notable alumni
 Kyle Cody - baseball player
 Terry A. Willkom - politician, former Wisconsin State Assembly member

References

External links
 

Roman Catholic Diocese of La Crosse
Catholic secondary schools in Wisconsin
Schools in Chippewa County, Wisconsin
Educational institutions established in 1883
1883 establishments in Wisconsin